Hebron is a hamlet in the community of Llanddyfnan, Ynys Môn, Wales, which is 136.7 miles (220 km) from Cardiff and 217 miles (349.2 km) from London.

References

See also 
 List of localities in Wales by population

Villages in Anglesey